Nefi Ismael Ogando (born June 3, 1989) is a Dominican professional baseball pitcher who is a free agent. He previously played in Major League Baseball (MLB) for the Philadelphia Phillies and Miami Marlins.

Career

Boston Red Sox
Ogando signed as an international free agent with the Boston Red Sox.

Philadelphia Phillies
In 2013, the Red Sox traded Ogando to the Philadelphia Phillies for John McDonald. In 2014, Ogando pitched for the Reading Fightin' Phils of the Class AA Eastern League. The Phillies assigned Ogando to the Arizona Fall League, and he appeared in the league's all-star game. After the season, the Phillies added Ogando to their 40-man roster.

The Philles promoted Ogando to the major leagues in August, but optioned him back to the minor leagues without making an appearance.

Ogando made his major league debut on September 9 against the Atlanta Braves at Citizens Bank Park. He pitched an inning in relief of Dalier Hinojosa and gave up two runs on a bases-clearing triple by Michael Bourn.

Miami Marlins
After the 2015 season, the Miami Marlins claimed Ogando from the Phillies off of waivers. Ogando began the 2016 season with the New Orleans Zephyrs of the Class AAA Pacific Coast League, and promoted him to the major leagues on May 3. On December 23, 2016, Ogando was claimed off waivers by the Pittsburgh Pirates. He was designated for assignment on February 10, 2017.

Cincinnati Reds
On February 14, Ogando was claimed by the Cincinnati Reds. He elected free agency on November 6, 2017.

Cleburne Railroaders
On February 8, 2019, Ogando signed with the Cleburne Railroaders of the independent American Association for the 2019 season. He was released on January 20, 2020.

High Point Rockers
On April 1, 2021, Ogando signed with the High Point Rockers of the Atlantic League of Professional Baseball. In 15 relief appearances, Ogando posted a 1–2 record with a 8.53 ERA and 8 strikeouts. He was released on August 3, 2021.

References

External links

1989 births
Living people
Águilas Cibaeñas players
Arizona League Reds players
Cleburne Railroaders players
Dominican Republic expatriate baseball players in the United States
Dominican Summer League Red Sox players
Greenville Drive players
High Point Rockers players
Indios de Mayagüez players
Dominican Republic expatriate baseball players in Puerto Rico
Jupiter Hammerheads players
Lehigh Valley IronPigs players
Leones del Escogido players
Louisville Bats players
Lowell Spinners players
Major League Baseball pitchers
Major League Baseball players from the Dominican Republic
Miami Marlins players
New Orleans Zephyrs players
Pensacola Blue Wahoos players
Philadelphia Phillies players
Reading Fightin Phils players
Salem Red Sox players
Scottsdale Scorpions players
Sportspeople from Santo Domingo